The 1898 Iowa State Normals football team represented Iowa State Normal School (later renamed University of Northern Iowa) as an independent during the 1898 college football season. In its first and only season under head coach Kalita E. Leighton, the team compiled a 4–0–1 record, including an 11–5 victory over the Iowa Hawkeyes, and outscored all opponents by a total of 92 to 5.

Schedule

References

Iowa State Normals
Northern Iowa Panthers football seasons
College football undefeated seasons
Iowa State Normal football